Il segreto del castello di Monroe is a 1914 Italian film directed by Augusto Genina.

External links 
 

1914 films
Italian silent short films
Films directed by Augusto Genina
Italian black-and-white films